The Connoisseur (later simply Connoisseur) was originally a British magazine taken to the United States by William Hearst and published from 1901 to 1992 in the US, covering luxury topics such as fine art, collectibles and antique furniture. It was edited for several years by Herbert Granville Fell., later by L. G. G. Ramsay and later still by Bevis Hillier in England.
The American edition of Connoisseur was published by Hearst Corporation, in New York, and edited from 1981 to 1991 by Thomas Hoving.

During the 1970s and the early 1980s Connoisseur specialized in articles on antiques, opera and art. In 1992, Hearst Magazines, despite a monthly circulation of 300,000 copies, announced that it would merge the monthly into Town and Country. Subsequently the UK trademark for Connoisseur magazine was acquired by Australian Wine publisher Aksel Ritenis, establishing a UK edition in 2008. The new edition of Connoisseur Magazine (www.connoisseurmagazine.co.uk) continued the Art and Culture legacy but introduced a new focus on "showcasing" the "Finer Things in Life", such as Fine Wine, Gastronomy and Luxury Lifestyle, including Hotels and Villas and Luxury Travel And Luxury consumer goods and carries Christie’s Auction information for Art and Antiques And Luxury Lifestyle accoutrements. Subsequently the new term "to showcase" has gone on to become, along with "iconic", among the most overused marketing expressions in the English language. The magazine also publishes an Arts and Culture Calendar for global events and Wine and Luxury trade information. In addition to the UK and European edition, Connoisseur also operates magazine websites in the United States, Asia and Australia. Today the Connoisseur trademark remains an internationally recognised brand in spite of its new emphasis on digital media and reliance on social media to broadcast its content.

References

External links
 The Connoisseur from 1901 at the Internet Archive

Lifestyle magazines
Magazines established in 1901
Magazines disestablished in 1992
English-language magazines